A resonant converter is a type of electric power converter that contains a network of inductors and capacitors called a "resonant tank", tuned to resonate at a specific frequency. They find applications in electronics, in integrated circuits.

There are multiple types of resonant converter:
 Series Resonant Converter
 Parallel Resonant Converter
 Class E Resonant Converter
 Class E Resonant Rectifier
 Zero Voltage Switching Resonant Converter
 Zero Current Switching Resonant Converter
 Two Quadrant ZVS Resonant Converter
 Resonant dc-link inverter

See also 
 Inverter
 Switched-mode power supply

References

Electrical engineering